The 1931 New Mexico A&M Aggies football team was an American football team that represented New Mexico College of Agriculture and Mechanical Arts (now known as New Mexico State University) as a member of the Border Conference during the 1931 college football season.  In its third year under head coach Jerry Hines, the team compiled a 7–1–2 record, finished last in the conference, and outscored all opponents by a total of 149 to 90.

Schedule

References

New Mexico AandM
New Mexico State Aggies football seasons
New Mexico AandM Aggies football